Ahmad Khan Bayat was the first khan of the Maku Khanate from 1747 to 1778.

References

People from Maku, Iran
Maku Khanate
18th-century monarchs of Persia
Year of birth unknown
Year of death unknown